The Pro-Cathedral of Our Lady of Grace is a catholic church on the east side of Praça Alexandre Albuquerque, in the city centre of Praia, on the island of Santiago, Cape Verde. The church was built between 1894 and 1902. It is the seat of the Roman Catholic Diocese of Santiago de Cabo Verde, which was created in 1533. It is under the pastoral responsibility of Arlindo Gomes Furtado Cardinal.

The church was built in neoclassical style. Its main façade and entrance are at the Praça Alexandre Albuquerque; the bell tower is at the rear of the church, on Avenida Andrade Corvo.

See also
Roman Catholicism in Cape Verde
Pro-Cathedral
List of churches in Cape Verde

References

Roman Catholic cathedrals in Cape Verde
Buildings and structures in Praia
Plateau of Praia
Roman Catholic churches completed in 1902
Portuguese colonial architecture in Cape Verde
20th-century Roman Catholic church buildings